Paul R. Gross is a biologist and author, perhaps best known to the general public for Higher Superstition (1994), written with Norman Levitt. Gross is the University Professor of Life Sciences (Emeritus) at the University of Virginia; he previously served the university as Provost and vice-president. He has written widely on biology, evolution and creationism, and the intellectual conflicts of the Science wars—for example, his book Creationism's Trojan Horse: The Wedge of Intelligent Design (2004), written with Barbara Forrest.

Gross earned his A.B. in zoology and his Ph.D. in general physiology from The University of Pennsylvania. He has taught at the Massachusetts Institute of Technology, New York University, Brown University, and the University of Rochester. From 1978 to 1988 he was Director and President of the Marine Biological Laboratory at Woods Hole, Massachusetts.

Bibliography
 (with Norman Levitt) Higher Superstition: The Academic Left and Its Quarrels With Science. (Baltimore: Johns Hopkins University Press, 1994). 
 Politicizing Science Education, Thomas B. Fordham Foundation, April 2000.
 "Berlinski Vanquishes Pseudoscience—Again," Commentary, December 16, 2002.
 "Intelligent Design and That Vast Right-Wing Conspiracy," Science Insights, September 2003.
 Creationism's Trojan Horse. Oxford University Press, 2004. 
 "Neo-creationist Tactics Show troubling Evolution," Science & Theology News, October 14, 2005.
 "Science Standards: We Can't afford to Go Light," National Review Online, November 16, 2005.

Year of birth missing (living people)
Living people
21st-century American biologists
Critics of creationism
University of Pennsylvania alumni
Massachusetts Institute of Technology faculty
New York University faculty
Brown University faculty
University of Rochester faculty
University of Virginia faculty
Critics of postmodernism